Stacy Glen Jones (born December 19, 1970) is an American musician, songwriter, and producer. He is currently the musical director and drummer for Miley Cyrus and Life of Dillon, and is also known for being the lead vocalist, rhythm guitarist, and primary songwriter of American Hi-Fi, and as the drummer for Letters to Cleo.

Background
Jones was born in Tulsa, Oklahoma but grew up in London. Jones initially came into the spotlight as the drummer for the alternative rock band Letters to Cleo. He went on to work with Veruca Salt and form the band American Hi-Fi, whose self-titled release produced by Bob Rock in 2001, included the Billboard Top 50 hit "Flavor of the Weak." After American Hi-Fi Jones worked as a producer and songwriter, and was a staff producer at Epic Records.  His production credits include work with Miley Cyrus, American Hi-Fi, Hey Violet, Matt Nathanson, Laura Marano, The Downtown Fiction, Ingrid Michaelson, Low vs Diamond, Meg & Dia and Plain White T's.
He is also half of the production duo Deathstar Productions with writer/producer Bill Lefler, and was a VP of A&R at Epic Records.

Career

Musical Director 
During the height of MTV’s reality show Laguna Beach, Jones was tasked with producing and A&Ring Open Air Stereo. Jones worked with the band to help bring their live show to a television audience for the first time on MTV’s Total Request Live. He was then approached to be the music director for Miley Cyrus, with whom he has been working with since 2006.

In addition to Miley Cyrus, Jones is the musical director for Noah Cyrus, 5 Seconds of Summer, Broods, Troye Sivan, Jordan Fisher, Life of Dillon, Shawn Hook, and The Chainsmokers.

Drummer
Jones continues to write, release records and tour with Letters to Cleo. He has been the touring drummer for Matchbox Twenty since 2012. He has also worked as a studio and touring musician for Madonna, Everclear, Dia Frampton, Veruca Salt, Letters to Cleo, Avril Lavigne, Ariana Grande, Joan Jett, Against Me!, The Jonas Brothers, The Flaming Lips, Lily Allen, Billy Ray Cyrus, Sheryl Crow, Cobra Starship, Aimee Mann, The Cab, Hey Monday, Butch Walker, The Dollyrots and more.

Production / Musician Credits

TV appearances 

The Voice, American Idol, Saturday Night Live, Dancing With the Stars, The Late Show with David Letterman, Jimmy Kimmel Live, The Tonight Show with Jay Leno, Late Night with Conan O'Brien, Good Morning America, The Today Show, Teen Choice Awards, Miley Cyrus: Bangerz Tour (NBC), CMT Music Awards, American Music Awards, Kids Choice Awards, The Today Show, Disney Channel Games, Dick Clark's New Year's Rockin' Eve, MTV Live.

References

1970 births
Living people
American male singers
American rock drummers
American rock guitarists
American male guitarists
American rock singers
Musicians from Tulsa, Oklahoma
Record producers from Oklahoma
Singers from Oklahoma
Guitarists from Oklahoma
20th-century American drummers
American male drummers
Veruca Salt members
American Hi-Fi members
Miley Cyrus Band members
Letters to Cleo members
21st-century American singers
21st-century American drummers